The Percy V. Pennybacker Jr. Bridge in Austin, Texas, is a through-arch bridge across Lake Austin which connects the northern and southern sections of the Loop 360 highway, also known as the "Capital of Texas Highway."  The road is widely considered one of the most scenic urban drives in Texas, in large part due to this arched weathering-steel bridge and the rolling hills that flank the road. In 2001, 48,000 vehicles crossed the bridge daily. Ten years prior to this, 22,000 vehicles had crossed the bridge daily.

History
More commonly known as the "360 Bridge," the contract for the bridge was let in late 1979 and major structural steelwork was finished by July 1982. The bridge was dedicated officially November 29, 1982 by Austin mayor Carole McClellan and other public officials and opened for traffic December 3, 1982.

The bridge is named for Percy V. Pennybacker Jr., who designed bridges for the Texas Highway Department and was a pioneer in the technology of welded structures.

Construction details

The steel bridge has a uniform weathered rust finish allowing the bridge to blend in with the surrounding hills and lake. The 600 short tons (544,311 kg) of steel for the bridge were produced in Japan. The bridge structures were fabricated in Ulsan, Korea by Hyundai Heavy Industries. The steel structures were shipped on the Jundale freighter to the Port of Houston and then trucked to the bridge site. The bridge was erected by Bristol Steel of Bristol, Virginia. The finish was sandblasted to ensure even weathering for an amber patina. The construction was coordinated by Clearwater Constructors (Hensel Phelps) of Denver, Colorado. Ed Westall was the project coordinator, Buddy Johnson was the project supervisor and David W. McDonnold was the bridge designing engineer. The bridge cost US$10 million to build.

Additionally, a local metal fabricator, Beck Tool & Manufacturing (Thomas L. Beck, Owner) was contracted to machine many of the critical components that anchor the cables suspending the roadway.

This design keeps Lake Austin free from support columns because the recreational lake (really a dammed stretch of the Colorado River) is popular with boaters and waterskiers. The untied arch suspension span is suspended by 72 steel cables. At the time of its construction, it was only the second bridge of its design in the world.

The bridge has four lanes, two in each direction, separated by a middle barrier wall.  The bridge also has a  bike and pedestrian lane. The bike access on the bridge is one reason for Loop 360's popularity with cyclists. The south approach provides a turnaround under the bridge along with lake access for public boating.

The bridge won first place in the 1984 Federal Highway Administration's Excellence in Highway Design competition.  In 1992, the Austin members of the Consulting Engineers Council of Texas were surveyed and selected the bridge as the most innovative example of Austin architecture.

See also
 List of crossings of the Colorado River

External links 
Pennybacker Bridge at Bridges & Tunnels
 
Google Earth 3D model of the Pennybacker Bridge
360 Pennybacker Bridge Photos by Brian P. Barnes

Bridges completed in 1982
Bridges in Austin, Texas
Through arch bridges in the United States
Road bridges in Texas
Weathering steel
1982 establishments in Texas
Bridges over the Colorado River (Texas)
Steel bridges in the United States